This is a list of Estonian television related events from 1974.

Events

Debuts

Television shows

Ending this year

Births
19 March - Ardo Ran Varres, composer and actor 
14 May - Anu Välba, TV and radio host
21 November - Tiit Sukk, actor and TV host
30 December - Henry Kõrvits, rapper and TV host

Deaths